Mateusz Jachlewski (born 27 December 1984) is a Polish handball player for Wybrzeże Gdańsk.

Career
He received a silver medal with the Polish team at the 2007 World Men's Handball Championship. He participated at the 2008 Summer Olympics, where Poland finished fifth.

References

External links
Profile

1984 births
Living people
Sportspeople from Gdynia
Polish male handball players
Olympic handball players of Poland
Handball players at the 2008 Summer Olympics
Handball players at the 2016 Summer Olympics
Vive Kielce players
21st-century Polish people